A juju is a supernatural power ascribed to an object.

Juju may also refer to:

Places
 Juju (district), one of seven districts on the island of Rotuma in Fiji
 Juju, a village in the district of the same name on the island of Rotuma
 Juju, Iran, a village in Isfahan Province, Iran

Music
 Jùjú music, a style of Nigerian popular music

Performers
 Juju (German rapper), German rapper
 Juju (Finnish rapper), Finnish rapper
 Juju (singer) (born 1976), Japanese singer
 Juju Casteneda Juju C from Love and Hip Hop
 JuJu Mob, a Philadelphia hip hop group
 JuJu, a member of the hip-hop group The Beatnuts

Albums
 JuJu (album), a 1964 album by Wayne Shorter
 Juju (Siouxsie and the Banshees album)
 Juju (Gass album)
 Juju (Chandrabindoo album), 2003
 Juju (Juju album), 2010
 Juju Music, a 1982 album by King Sunny Adé

Songs
 "Juju", a song by Ice Prince from the album Everybody Loves Ice Prince
"Ju-Ju", a 2018 song by a Russian rock band Leningrad

People

People named Juju
 Juju Chang (born 1965), Korean-American news anchor and reporter
 Ju Ju Wilson, Australian aboriginal artist

People nicknamed Juju 
 Justine Henin (born 1982), Belgian tennis player
 Julius Malema (born 1981), South African politician
 JuJu Smith-Schuster (born 1996), American football player

Other uses
 JuJu Densetsu, the Japanese name of the video game Toki
 Juju, a character from The Sword of Etheria
 Juju (software), a service orchestration tool
 JuJu, an Australian brand of menstrual cups